John or Johnny Lawlor may refer to:
 John Lawlor (actor), American actor
 John Lawlor (athlete) (1934–2018), Irish Olympic athlete
 John Lawlor (cricketer) (1864–1908), Australian cricketer
 John Lawlor (sculptor) (c. 1820–1901), Irish sculptor and medallist
 Johnny Lawlor (born 1937), Scottish footballer
 Kit Lawlor (John Christopher Lawlor, 1922–2004), Irish footballer